Ua Corcrain of Clonfert, Abbot of Clonfert, died 1095.

Ua Corcrain may have been a member of the Ó Cormacáin ecclesiastical family based in Síol Anmchadha, in what is now south-east County Galway.

Since the 18th and 19th century the name has been rendered as Ó Cormacáin, Cormacan, Cormican.

See also
 Maelcoluim Ua Cormacain, Abbot of Aran, died 1114.
 Muirchertach Ua Carmacáin, Bishop of Clonfert, 1195–1203.
 Uilliam Ó Cormacáin, Archbishop of Tuam, 5 May 1386 – 1393.
 Henry Ó Cormacáin, last Abbot of Clonfert, fl. c.1534-c.1567.

References 

 Annals of Ulster at CELT: Corpus of Electronic Texts at University College Cork
 Annals of Tigernach at CELT: Corpus of Electronic Texts at University College Cork
Revised edition of McCarthy's synchronisms at Trinity College Dublin.
 Byrne, Francis John (2001), Irish Kings and High-Kings, Dublin: Four Courts Press, 

Christian clergy from County Galway
11th-century Irish abbots
1095 deaths
11th-century Irish bishops
Year of birth unknown